Richard Elmer Forbes (5 December 1894 – 9 December 1978) was a Progressive Conservative party member of the House of Commons of Canada. He was born in Bruce County, Ontario and became a farmer and registered seed grower by career.

He was first elected at the Dauphin riding in the 1958 general election after an initial unsuccessful attempt to win the seat in 1953. He was re-elected in 1962, 1963 and 1965.

After completing his term in the 27th Canadian Parliament in 1968, Forbes left federal politics and did not seek another term in Parliament.

References

External links
 

1894 births
1978 deaths
Members of the House of Commons of Canada from Manitoba
People from Bruce County
Progressive Conservative Party of Canada MPs